Sole nudo (Naked Sun) is a 1984 Italian-Brazilian film written and directed by Tonino Cervi.

The film is about Luca Adami who, after troubles at work, escapes from Rome to Rio de Janeiro and is helped by a friend to find a new job there. Unfortunately he has disappointing results, and wants to commit suicide.

However, in Rio he  meets a beautiful girl from the favelas, who takes him to visit the most secret and mystical places of this beautiful city. He is also encouraged by an enigmatic waiter and regains the will to live.

The film ends with the two performers dancing on Copacabana beach at dawn.

Cast
 David Brandon as Luca Adami
 Tânia Alves as Regina
 Paolo Bonacelli as the waiter
 Eliana Araujo as the mulatto girl
 Isaura De Assis
 Bebeto Alves
 Carlos de Carvalho as the director
 Dennis De Carvalho as De Bernardi
 Antonio Maimone as Giovanni
 Girolamo Marzano as Fabio

External links

 Sole nudo on Movie Player
 Sole nudo on TV
 Sole nudo on My Movies

1984 films
Brazilian drama films
Films set in Italy
Films set in Rio de Janeiro (city)
Films directed by Tonino Cervi
Italian drama films
Brazilian multilingual films
Italian multilingual films
1984 drama films
1980s Italian films